Sri Muda is a major township in Section 25, Shah Alam, Selangor, Malaysia. This township is located in Klang District at the south of Shah Alam, between Kota Kemuning and Alam Megah.

Townships in Selangor